Suffield Gothic is an album by the American jazz pianist Ran Blake featuring saxophonist Houston Person. It was recorded in 1983 and released on the Italian Soul Note label.

Reception
The Allmusic review by Scott Yanow awarded the album 2½ stars, stating "No Ran Blake record is ever dull".

Track listing
All compositions by Ran Blake except as indicated
 "Curtis" - 3:39 
 "Pete Kelly's Blues" (Sammy Cahn, Ray Heindorf) - 2:49 
 "There's Been a Change in My Life" (Hubert Powell) - 4:04 
 "Vanguard" - 4:47 
 "Ol' Man River" (Oscar Hammerstein II, Jerome Kern) - 5:23 
 "Tribute to Mahalia: Walk over God's Heaven/It Don't Cost Very Much" (Thomas A. Dorsey/Traditional) - 6:27 
 "Indian Winter" - 5:57 
 "The Stars and Stripes Forever" (John Philip Sousa) - 3:47 
 "Midnight Local to Tate County" - 5:56 
Recorded at Vanguard Studios in New York City on September 28 & 29, 1983

Personnel
Ran Blake – piano
Houston Person – tenor saxophone (tracks 1, 5, 7 & 9)

References

Black Saint/Soul Note albums
Ran Blake albums
Solo piano jazz albums
1983 albums